Ellen Minna Bleakly (née Heine; 8 August 1907 – 27 July 1989) was a New Zealand-born botanist, photographer, and painter. As a botanist, Heine made contributions to research into the relationship between New Zealand insects and native flowers. She also undertook research into brown seaweeds in the genus Xiphophora.  Photographs created by Heine are held in the collection of the National Museum of New Zealand Te Papa Tongarewa. Of particular historical interest are the photographs she took of the University of Canterbury Cass Field Station.

Early life and education 
She was educated at Victoria University College where she graduated with a Master of Science degree with honours in botany in 1929.

References

20th-century New Zealand women scientists
New Zealand marine biologists
New Zealand women botanists
20th-century New Zealand botanists
Women phycologists
Victoria University of Wellington alumni
1907 births
1989 deaths
People from Wellington City
Academic staff of the University of Canterbury